Bishop Gardiner may refer to:

 Stephen Gardiner (c. 1483 - 1555) - English Roman Catholic bishop and politician who served as Lord Chancellor
 James Gardiner (1637–1705) - English bishop of Lincoln.